Craig Seton Mitchell is an American former professional baseball pitcher. Mitchell pitched in parts of three seasons, from  until , for the Oakland Athletics of the Major League Baseball(MLB).

Career
Mitchell was the Oakland Athletics first-round draft pick in the secondary phase of the 1973 Major League Baseball Draft. He had previously been drafted twice, once by the New York Mets and once by the New York Yankees, but did not sign with either team.

Sources
, or Retrosheet, or Pura Pelota (Venezuelan Winter League)

1954 births
Living people
American expatriate baseball players in Canada
Baseball players from California
Birmingham A's players
Burlington Bees players
Lewiston Broncs players
Major League Baseball pitchers
Navegantes del Magallanes players
American expatriate baseball players in Venezuela
Oakland Athletics players
Ogden A's players
San Jose Missions players
Spokane Falls Bigfoot baseball players
Sportspeople from Santa Rosa, California
Tucson Toros players
Vancouver Canadians players